Yoann Lemoine (born 16 March 1983), known professionally as Woodkid, is a French music video director, graphic designer and singer-songwriter. His most notable works include his music video direction for Katy Perry's "Teenage Dream", Taylor Swift's "Back to December", Lana Del Rey's "Born to Die" and Harry Styles's "Sign of the Times".

Lemoine is also a chamber pop musician. On 28 March 2011, he released his first EP Iron EP. On 18 March 2013, he released his first album titled The Golden Age, which is an autobiographical record. He released his second album S16 on 16 October 2020, more than seven years later, following some single releases.

Life and career

Early life
Yoann Lemoine was born in Tassin-la-Demi-Lune, near Lyon to a mother of Polish-Jewish origin. He studied illustration and animation at the Émile Cohl school, where he completed his diploma with honors. He then left for the UK to follow a silk screen printing process course at Swindon College. In 2004, Yoann moved to Paris. After a brief experience at H5, he joined Luc Besson's crew and worked on the project Arthur and the Invisibles for a year. In 2006, Yoann directed a series of roughs for Sofia Coppola's Marie Antoinette.

2011–2019: Beginnings, The Golden Age, and other ventures
His first musical project is about the transition from childhood to adulthood and his countryside background. The songs can be described as 'organic' and wooden. The project is about a kid, who starts organic and later turns himself into marble. One explanation as to why Lemoine became a musician is that guitarist Richie Havens gave him a ukulele during a video shoot he was directing. Woodkid released the Iron EP on 28 March 2011. For the music video for the single "Iron" (composed by Yoann Lemoine), he collaborated with English model Agyness Deyn. The song was featured in trailers for Ubisoft's Assassin's Creed: Revelations and the film Hitchcock as well as the TV series Teen Wolf.

On 6 October 2011, during a live performance in Brussels, he performed a cover of the Katy Perry song "Teenage Dream" (whose official video he directed). On 15 October 2011, he sang on stage with Lana Del Rey in New York City. He co-created the video for her song "Born to Die". He performed at the London Jazz Festival on 15 November 2012.

The French couture brand Dior Homme's fall-winter 2013 collection, "A Soldier on My Own", was inspired by Woodkid's "Iron", and is named after a phrase in the lyrics. The song was used as the soundtrack of the show.

On 15 December 2012, Lemoine announced he was beginning recording of his debut album, to be named The Golden Age. It was released on 18 March 2013 through independent label, Green United Music. Lemoine released the official album cover through a video he created himself on 14 December 2012 and released the album's corresponding track listing one week later on 21 December on his official Facebook page. 

"Run Boy Run" was directed by Lemoine himself and was used in several O2 and Science Channel adverts (those voiced by Sean Bean). It was also used in the teaser trailers for the BBC's series Musketeers, in January 2014. The music video for "Run Boy Run" was nominated for Best Short Form Music Video at the 2013 Grammy Awards. The song was also used in the trailer for the game Dying Light. "Run Boy Run" and "I Love You" were featured on the soundtrack of the 2014 film Divergent. During his Golden Age tour, Woodkid performed at the London Brixton Academy with the BBC Concert Orchestra in November 2013, and was invited by the Montreux Jazz Festival to perform for the second time with the Sinfonietta de Lausanne at the Stravinsky Auditorium. The Golden Age tour performances were marked by a well-coordinated light show and visual projections that included imagery from his music videos. The song is also used in the Umbrella Academy, in connection to Number 5, and the episode was also called Run Boy Run. 

In January 2014, Lemoine / Woodkid was invited to give a performance and talk about the New York minimalist movement with Philip Glass by the Opéra and Museum of Modern Art of Saint-Étienne. In February 2014, Woodkid received the award for best stage performer at the French equivalent of the Grammy Awards, Les Victoires de la Musique. In 2014, Woodkid / Lemoine worked as creative director for Pharrell Williams' 24 Hours of Happy music video concept, seen more than 600 million times on YouTube. He also served as creative director of the video campaign for John Legend's album Love in the Future, produced by Kanye West, including videos for "Who Do We Think We Are", directed by Paul Gore and "Made to Love", directed by Daniel Sannwald.

In April 2014, Woodkid performed at Coachella. On 26 June 2014, Woodkid opened the Montreal International Jazz Festival with a free outdoor concert to an audience of 100,000+. In July 2014, Ubisoft released its second cinematic trailer for Assassin's Creed Unity, where "The Golden Age" was played. In August 2014, Woodkid performed at the FM4 Frequency Festival in Austria. In December 2014, Woodkid performed at Wonderfruit in Thailand. He also directed Pharrell Williams's Coachella show, featuring Jay Z, Gwen Stefani, Usher, Pusha T, Busta Rhymes, and Puff Daddy. The Cavaliers Drum and Bugle Corps featured "Run Boy Run" as part of their 2015 repertoire, entitled "Game On".

On 15 July 2016, Woodkid performed at the Montreux Jazz Festival at a special "Woodkid and Friends" evening with a nearly all acoustic set. He was accompanied by the Sinfonietta de Lausanne orchestra and a choir of children from the Montreux Choral Festival. Among his friends who also performed at this event were Son Lux, The Shoes, Ed Droste, Thomas Bloch, and actress Elle Fanning singing for the first time live on a stage. On 16 September 2016, Woodkid promoted Mykki Blanco's debut album on his Facebook page. He is featured on the single "High School Never Ends" and helped produce the album. In March 2017, the second episode of 13 Reasons Why aired, featuring "Run Boy Run". In February 2019, the second episode of The Umbrella Academy aired, which also featured "Run Boy Run" and used the song as the episode's namesake. In May 2022, the fifth episode of The Pentaverate aired, which also featured "Run Boy Run".

2019–present: Singles, S16 and collaboration with Paris 2024
On 7 May 2019, Woodkid released the EP Woodkid For Nicolas Ghesquière – Louis Vuitton Works One, featuring Jennifer Connelly and Moses Sumney.

On 12 December 2019, Woodkid announced the production of a new album set to release in 2020. On 24 April 2020, Woodkid released "Goliath", the first single from his upcoming album. He released on 16 October 2020 his next album "S16".
In 2021, Woodkid teamed up with Paris 2024 to compose a new song called "Prologue", this song was featured in the closing ceremony of the Olympic Games Tokyo 2020 and the 2020 Summer Paralympics closing ceremony and was released on digital platforms on 8 August of that year.

On 27 October 2021, Woodkid announced on Twitter that he had made an original song for the Riot Games series Arcane. The song in question, "Guns For Hire", was featured in the sixth episode of the series released in November 2021. On 30 November 2021, Woodkid made a post threatening legal action concerning the use of his music in propaganda from a group supporting politician Éric Zemmour. The post quickly gained popularity, gathering over 48,000 likes in just 7 hours.

In 2022, Lemoine collaborated with French singer-songwriter Mylène Farmer on her twelfth album, "L'Emprise", producing more than half of the album. He also provided the artwork for the album.

Directing and awards
In June 2010, he received 5 Lions for his AIDS Awareness campaign Graffiti at the Cannes Lions Advertising festival.

Lemoine's films are produced by Iconoclast.

In 2012, Lemoine received the award for Best Director of the Year at the MVPA Awards in Los Angeles and was nominated for 6 MTV Video Music awards for his videos for Lana Del Rey, Drake, and Rihanna.

Personal life
Lemoine is openly gay.

Discography

Albums

Soundtracks

Extended plays

Singles

As lead artist

As featured artist

Notes

Music videos

Videography as director

Awards

References

External links

 
 Woodkid on labelgum (Green United Music)
 Woodkid's Discography on discogs

1983 births
English-language film directors
French music video directors
French people of Polish-Jewish descent
Living people
French male singer-songwriters
French gay musicians
French pop musicians
French LGBT singers
French LGBT songwriters
Gay singers
Gay songwriters
21st-century French male singers
20th-century LGBT people
21st-century LGBT people
LGBT film directors